Sant Charandas was a major Hindu religious teacher in Delhi during the eighteenth century.

Biography
Sant Charandas was born in the village Dehra in the Alwar District, Rajsthan in Vikrami Samvat 1760 i.e. 1703 AD in Chyavan Gautriya Bhraguvanshi Dhusar Brahman family according to his BHAKTI SAGAR ADI VANI published by Khemraj Krishnadas publication, Mumbai. Whatever the family settled in other villages by leaving DHOSI village of Hariyana are called DHUSAR which include Brahmins as well as other castes. That is why the dhusar Brahman families are being written merchants  by mistake. His father Mr. Murlidhar Das and Mata ji Mrs. Kuzo Devi were also devotees of Bhagwan Krishna. Sant Charandas is called the Anshavatar (sharehavior) of Lord Krishna. 

At the age of five,  Sri Sukukdev Muni visited and given him DARSHAN. In adolescence, he left for pilgrimage and at the age of 19 years, Shri Shukdev Muni appeared before him given GURU DEEKSHA at SHUKTAL on the bank of GANGAJI. Than Sant Charndas residing in Delhi and for 14 years of penance. Than he visited Sravrundavan Dham and returned to Delhi.

After listening to his influences and miracles in Delhi, the then King Muhammadshah also became his Disciple and donated him many villages. Charanas had given the deficiency of the attack on Delhi's King Nadirshah six months ago in writing King Muhammadshah. Sant Charandas  gave the prediction in witten to Muhmmad Shah about the attack of Nadir Shah on Delhi before six months. Nadirshah also listened to his reputation and left him back from Delhi to Iran.

SANT CHARAN DAS had written following 17 books on Yoga, Bhakti and Sant Darshan :

1. BHRIJ CHARITRA ब्रजचरित्र 2. AMARLOK AKHAND DHAM VARNAN अमरलोक अखण्डधाम वर्णन 3. ASHTANGA YOG अष्टाङ्गयोग 4. SHATKARM HATHYOG VARNAN षट्कर्म हठयोग वर्णन  5. YOG SANDEH SAGAR योगसन्देश सागर 6. GYAN SWARODAYA ज्ञानस्वरोदय 7. HAMSNADOPNISHAD हंसोपनिषद 8. DHARAM JAHAJ धर्मजहाज 9. SARVOPNISHAD सर्वोपनिषद 10. TATVA YOGOPNISHAD तत्वयोगोपनिषद 11. YOGSHIKHOPNISHAD योगशिखोपनिषद 12. TEJBINDU UPNISHAD तेजबिन्दु उपनिषद 13. BHAKTI PADARATH भक्ति पदार्थ 14. MANVIKRIT KARAN GUTKASAR मनविकृत करण गुटकासार 15. SHRIBRAHMGYANSAR श्रीब्रह्मज्ञानसार 16. SHABDVARNAN शब्द वर्णन 17. BHAKTISAGAR VARNAN भक्तिसागर वर्णन.

He was succeeded to his spiritual seat (Guru-Gaddi) by his cousin sisters of his Chyavan Gautriya Bhriguvanshi Dhusar family of Alwar, the Saints Sahjo Bai and Daya Bai were the nieces and disciples of Sant Charandas. Bodh the women sents' verses were read and liked widespread all over India from Delhi to Gujarat. There are more than a hundred monasteries in the whole of India of SHUK SECT of Vaishnavas established by Sant Charan Das. 

SANT CHARNDAS achieved salvation by sacrificing body by Samadhi in Vikrami Samvat 1839 i.e. 1782 AD at the age of 79.

Teachings
Charandas is the author of around twenty works. Many of these are in verse and deal with aspects of devotion, particularly relating to the worship of Krishna. He is credited by his followers with a vision of Krishna while on pilgrimage to Vraj in mid-life, as well as a further meeting with Shukdev at the same time.

He wrote commentaries on various Upanishads, particularly the Katha Upanishad, and on specific yoga practices, especially Pranayama, control of the breath.

A member of the Sant mystical tradition, Charandas's teachings draw on a wide range of sources and emphasize the nearness of the Divine to each person, the need to follow a guru, the importance of sharing in a community of like-minded believers not dependent on caste (Satsang), and the value of leading a strictly moral life.

Two of his major disciples, Sahjo Bai and Daya Bai, both women, are also famous for their poetry.

Sources

References

 
 
 

1703 births
18th-century Hindu religious leaders
Indian Hindu saints
Scholars from Delhi
1782 deaths